Sisurcana pascoana is a species of moth of the family Tortricidae. It is found in Peru.

The wingspan is about 22 mm. The ground colour of the forewings is yellowish cream, suffused with pale rust brown especially in the basal half. The hindwings are creamish, but paler basally, with some brown-grey spots.

Etymology
The species name refers to the Pasco Region, the type locality.

References

Moths described in 2010
Sisurcana
Moths of South America
Taxa named by Józef Razowski